Netter Digital Entertainment (NDE) was a visual effects and CGI special effects company founded in 1995 and went out of business in 2000.

History 
Netter Digital Entertainment was created by Douglas Netter in 1995. The company produced the show Hypernauts before moving to digital EFX work and replacing Foundation Imaging in the final two seasons of Babylon 5 as the sole producer of CGI special effects for that series as well as several of the B5 Made-For-TV movies.  NDE also produced all the effects for its short-lived spinoff, Crusade.

With the cancellation of Crusade in 1999, Netter Digital lost its only client. They subsequently worked on the Dan Dare, Max Steel, and Robotech 3000 animated television series, but this was not enough to prevent them going out of business in 2000. They were replaced on Dan Dare and Max Steel by Foundation Imaging.

Filmography 

 Babylon 5
 Crusade
 Dane Dare
 Max Steel
 Robotech 3000

References

Visual effects companies
Film production companies of the United States
Defunct companies based in California
Mass media companies established in 1995
Mass media companies disestablished in 2000
1995 establishments in California
2000 disestablishments in California